Eliksir (Elixir) is the second studio album by Norwegian hard rock band Skambankt. The first single "Tyster" received a decent amount of radio airplay, and it entered the Norwegian album charts on 8th place the week after its release. A video was made to promote the record's second single "Dynasti". The "Intro", which is the main riff of "Nok et Offer" played on church bells, was played on the bells of the clocktower of Oslo Rådhus in Oslo and recorded. "Nok et Offer" originally appeared on the Skamania EP, but was re-recorded for this album. The track "Siste Stikk" was recorded in the independent studio Suksesslaboratoriet rather than the Propeller Music Division Studio.

Track listing
All music/lyrics by Ted Winters/Don Fist unless otherwise noted. All lyrics are in the Norwegian language.
"Intro"
"Nok et Offer" (Another Victim)
"Dynasti" (Dynasty)
"Stormkast #1" (Gust #1)
"Tyster" (Snitch)
"Ordets Gud" (God of Words)
"Min Eliksir" (My Elixir)
"Siste Stikk" (Last Laugh) (Winters)
"Fritt Fall" (Free Fall) (Winters)
"Angst"
"Idyllillusjonen" (The Utopia Illusion)
"Bak Låste Dører" (Behind Locked Doors)

Chart

References 

2007 albums
Skambankt albums